Jason Guida (born August 4, 1977) is a former American professional mixed martial artist who last competed for Bellator. A professional competitor from 2003 until 2014, he also fought for EliteXC, the WEC, KSW, Adrenaline MMA and World Extreme Fighting. Jason is the older brother of Ultimate Fighting Championship veteran Clay Guida.

Background
Born and raised in Illinois, Guida began wrestling in elementary school, he is four years older than his brother Clay. Both wrestled at Johnsburg High School and William Rainey Harper College. They both won a NAIA national title in 2001.

Mixed martial arts career

Early career
Guida only had two amateur fights before turning professional in 2003.

The Ultimate Fighter
Guida appeared on The Ultimate Fighter: Team Nogueira vs. Team Mir and was eliminated in the first episode for failing to make the 206 lb weight limit by one pound.

Independent promotions
Following this, as a last minute replacement for Ken Shamrock, Guida faced former WWE pro wrestling star Bobby Lashley. Guida lost via unanimous decision.  Before his bout with Lashley, he and Guida got in a scuffle at a pre-fight press conference that had to be broken up by Roy Jones Jr.

Guida then suffered losses to UFC veteran Jeremy Horn and top Chechen contender Mamed Khalidov, but overcame his losing streak with a knockout win over former UFC fighter Logan Clark, ending the fight with a barrage of punches in the first round in Clark's hometown of Rochester, Minnesota.

In 2009 Jason was set to take on 2011 ADCC World Championship Nottingham Gold Medalist and former  UFC fighter, Vinny Magalhães in the main event of "Carolina Crown 2" as a late replacement for Lance Evans, the brother of UFC star Rashad Evans. He later dropped out of the fight due to a lower back injury sustained during training, he was replaced by Bellator fighter Chris Davis.

In 2010, Guida then tried out for The Ultimate Fighter 12 in the Light Heavyweight division but was unsuccessful when the Light Heavyweights were cut before the season started in favor of a Lightweight only season.

Bellator
Guida stepped in as a replacement and fought Justin Lemke at Bellator 29 in a 210 lb catchweight bout and his Bellator debut. Guida weighed in 5 lbs over the catchweight limit and the fight was changed to a 215 lb catchweight bout.

In 2011, Jason joined his brother Clay and started training under top mixed martial arts trainer, Greg Jackson, in an attempt to reinvent his fighting career.

On November 16, 2012 Guida was scheduled to make his return against former UFC veteran Jason Brilz in the main event of Disorderly Conduct 13. The fight was later scrapped due to an injury Jason suffered training with Greg Jackson's MMA.

Guida fought Anthony Gomez at Bellator 112 on March 14, 2014, after his original opponent Sean Salmon pulled out for undisclosed reasons. He lost via unanimous decision.

Controversies
Guida was involved in a backstage scuffle with former UFC veteran Sean McCorkle at UFC 123 in which members of Guida's camp and Guida himself warned McCorkle that Jason was a made man.

In 2016, Guida yet again was involved in a backstage scuffle, this time with UFC veteran Nate Diaz at UFC 199 after his brother Clay lost his fight against Brian Ortega via knockout, Jason became visibly upset after the end of Clay's fight before approaching Diaz backstage as he was preparing to enter a Q&A interview about his main event fight with Conor McGregor before Jason suddenly bull rushed Nate and pressed him up against a wall before Justin Buchholz and UFC staff intervened and separated the two of them.

Personal life
Jason and his girlfriend had a daughter in 2009.

Mixed martial arts record

|-
| Loss
| align=center| 19–28 (2)
| Anthony Gomez
| Decision (unanimous)
| Bellator 112
| 
| align=center| 3
| align=center| 5:00
| Hammond, Indiana
| 
|-
| Win
| align=center| 19–27 (2)
| Keith Richards
| TKO (punches)
| C-3 Fights Fall Brawl
| 
| align=center| 1
| align=center| 2:47
| Newkirk, Oklahoma, United States
| 
|-
| Loss
| align=center| 18–27 (2)
| Sam Alvey
| Decision (split)
| NAFC: Bad Blood
| 
| align=center| 3
| align=center| 5:00
| Milwaukee, Wisconsin, United States
| 
|-
| Loss
| align=center| 18–26 (2)
| Nick Rossborough
| Decision (unanimous)
| Chicago Cagefighting Championship
| 
| align=center| 3
| align=center| 5:00
| Chicago, Illinois, United States
| 
|-
| Loss
| align=center| 18–25 (2)
| Justin Lemke
| Decision (split)
| Bellator 29
| 
| align=center| 3
| align=center| 5:00
| Milwaukee, Wisconsin, United States
| 
|-
| Loss
| align=center| 18–24 (2)
| Jeff Monson
| Submission (rear naked choke)
| Elite Promotions: Monson vs Guida
| 
| align=center| 2
| align=center| 3:04
| Pompano Beach, Florida, United States
| 
|-
| Loss
| align=center| 18–23 (2)
| Mark George
| TKO (injury)
| PP: The Real Deal
| 
| align=center| 2
| align=center| 1:33
| Columbus, Georgia, United States
| 
|-
| Win
| align=center| 18–22 (2)
| Logan Clark
| KO (punches)
| Fight Nation: Guida vs. Clark
| 
| align=center| 1
| align=center| 0:07
| Rochester, Minnesota, United States
| 
|-
| Loss
| align=center| 17–22 (2)
| Jeremy Horn
| Submission (arm-triangle choke)
| Arena Rumble: Guida vs. Horn
| 
| align=center| 1
| align=center| 4:03
| Spokane, Washington, United States
| 
|-
| Loss
| align=center| 17–21 (2)
| Bobby Lashley
| Decision (unanimous)
| SRP: March Badness
| 
| align=center| 3
| align=center| 5:00
| Pensacola, Florida, United States
| 
|-
| Loss
| align=center| 17–20 (2)
| Matt Sassolino
| Decision (split)
| C-3: Domination
| 
| align=center| 3
| align=center| 5:00
| Hammond, Indiana, United States
| 
|-
| Loss
| align=center| 17–19 (2)
| Mamed Khalidov
| TKO (strikes)
| ShoXC: Elite Challenger Series
| 
| align=center| 2
| align=center| 4:53
| Hammond, Indiana, United States
|
|-
| Loss
| align=center| 17–18 (2)
| Mike Russow
| Submission (guillotine choke)
| Adrenaline MMA: Guida vs Russow
| 
| align=center| 1
| align=center| 2:13
| Hoffman Estates, Illinois, United States
| 
|-
| Win
| align=center| 17–17 (2)
| Cristiano Machado
| Submission (guillotine choke)
| Costa Rica Fights 9
| 
| align=center| 2
| align=center| 0:18
| Limón, Costa Rica
| 
|-
| Win
| align=center| 16–17 (2)
| Mike Van Meer
| TKO (punches)
| CFC 2: Explosion
| 
| align=center| 1
| align=center| 0:40
| Tinley Park, Illinois, United States
| 
|-
| Loss
| align=center| 15–17 (2)
| Travis Wiuff
| Decision (unanimous)
| XFO 14: Xtreme Fighting
| 
| align=center| 3
| align=center| 5:00
| Peoria, Illinois, United States
| 
|-
| Loss
| align=center| 15–16 (2)
| Terry Martin
| KO
| XFO 13: Operation Beatdown
| 
| align=center| 3
| align=center| 0:08
| Peoria, Illinois, United States
| 
|-
| Win
| align=center| 15–15 (2)
| Antony Rea
| Decision (unanimous)
| Absolute Fighting Championships 18
| 
| align=center| 3
| align=center| 5:00
| Boca Raton, Florida, United States
| 
|-
| Loss
| align=center| 14–15 (2)
| Alex Stiebling
| Decision (split)
| WEC 22: The Hitmen
| 
| align=center| 3
| align=center| 5:00
| Lemoore, California, United States
| 
|-
| Loss
| align=center| 14–14 (2)
| Marvin Eastman
| Decision (unanimous)
| WEF: Orleans Arena
| 
| align=center| 5
| align=center| 5:00
| Las Vegas, Nevada, United States
| 
|-
| Win
| align=center| 14–13 (2)
| Armondo Mena
| TKO (punches)
| Costa Rica Fights 6
| 
| align=center| 1
| align=center| 2:54
| Limón, Costa Rica
| 
|-
| Win
| align=center| 13–13 (2)
| Allen Vindas
| Submission (armbar)
| Costa Rica Fights 5
| 
| align=center| 1
| align=center| 1:03
| Limón, Costa Rica
| 
|-
| Win
| align=center| 12–13 (2)
| Marvin Eastman
| Submission (guillotine choke)
| WEF: Orleans Arena
| 
| align=center| 3
| align=center| 2:07
| Las Vegas, Nevada, United States
| 
|-
| Win
| align=center| 11–13 (2)
| William Hill
| Decision (majority)
| Total Fight Challenge 5
| 
| align=center| 3
| align=center| 5:00
| Hammond, Indiana, United States
| 
|-
| Loss
| align=center| 10–13 (2)
| Vernon White
| TKO (doctor stoppage)
| WEC 18: Unfinished Business
| 
| align=center| 1
| align=center| 5:00
| Lemoore, California, United States
| 
|-
| Loss
| align=center| 10–12 (2)
| Adam Maciejewski
| Decision (split)
| Combat: Do Fighting Challenge 5
| 
| align=center| 3
| align=center| 5:00
| Hammond, Illinois, United States
| 
|-
| Loss
| align=center| 10–11 (2)
| Thales Leites
| Submission (armbar)
| Ultimate Warriors Combat 1
| 
| align=center| 1
| align=center| 1:38
| Honolulu, Hawaii, United States
| 
|-
| Win
| align=center| 10–10 (2)
| Pat Stano
| KO (punch)
| Euphoria: USA vs. Japan
| 
| align=center| 1
| align=center| 3:05
| Atlantic City, New Jersey, United States
| 
|-
| Loss
| align=center| 9–10 (2)
| Damir Mirenic
| Decision
| KSW IV: Konfrontacja
| 
| align=center| 3
| align=center| 5:00
| Warsaw, Poland
|
|-
| Loss
| align=center| 9–9 (2)
| Jacek Buczko
| Decision
| KSW IV: Konfrontacja
| 
| align=center| 3
| align=center| 5:00
| Warsaw, Poland
| 
|-
| Win
| align=center| 9–8 (2)
| Ed Meyers
| TKO (broken nose)
| Combat: Do Fighting Challenge 4
| 
| align=center| 1
| align=center| 0:19
| Hammond, Illinois, United States
| 
|-
| Win
| align=center| 8–8 (2)
| Ron Faircloth
| Submission (guillotine choke)
| Madtown Throwdown 4
| 
| align=center| 1
| align=center| 0:40
| Madison, Wisconsin, United States
| 
|-
| Loss
| align=center| 7–8 (2)
| Eric Schafer
| Submission (triangle choke)
| XFO 6: Judgement Day
| 
| align=center| 1
| align=center| 3:49
| Lakemoor, Illinois, United States
| 
|-
| Win
| align=center| 7–7 (2)
| Leo Vargas
| TKO (submission to punches)
| Combat: Do Fighting Challenge 3
| 
| align=center| 1
| align=center| 4:40
| Hammond, Illinois, United States
| 
|-
| Win
| align=center| 6–7 (2)
| Ron Fields
| Technical Submission (rear-naked choke)
| SuperBrawl 40: Guida vs. Fields 2
| 
| align=center| 3
| align=center| 4:05
| Hammond, Illinois, United States
| 
|-
| Win
| align=center| 5–7 (2)
| Atte Backman
| Submission (guillotine choke)
| Fight Festival 14
| 
| align=center| 1
| align=center| 1:54
| Tampere, Finland
| 
|-
| Win
| align=center| 4–7 (2)
| Ron Fields
| Submission (rear-naked choke)
| XFO 5: Repent
| 
| align=center| 3
| align=center| 3:10
| Peoria, Illinois, United States
| 
|-
| Loss
| align=center| 3–7 (2)
| Jorge Ortiz
| Decision (split)
| MMA Mexico 1
| 
| align=center| 3
| align=center| 5:00
| Mexico City, Mexico
| 
|-
| Win
| align=center| 3–6 (2)
| Mark Wallen
| Decision (split)
| XFO 4: Asylum
| 
| align=center| 3
| align=center| 5:00
| McHenry, Illinois, United States
| 
|-
| Loss
| align=center| 2–6 (2)
| Tom Murphy
| TKO (submission to punches)
| Main Event: Indiana
| 
| align=center| 3
| align=center| 3:46
| Gary, Indiana, United States
| 
|-
| Win
| align=center| 2–5 (2)
| Justin Hutter
| Submission (arm-triangle choke)
| Do Fighting Combat 1
| 
| align=center| 1
| align=center| 0:45
| Hammond, Illinois, United States
| 
|-
| Win
| align=center| 1–5 (2)
| Leo Sylvest
| Submission (armbar)
| XFO 3: Guida vs. Sylvest
| 
| align=center| 1
| align=center| 2:55
| Lake Geneva, Wisconsin, United States
| 
|-
| Loss
| align=center| 0–5 (2)
| Rory Markham
| Submission (armbar)
| XFO 2: New Blood
| 
| align=center| 2
| align=center| 0:58
| Fontana-on-Geneva Lake, Wisconsin, United States
| 
|-
| Loss
| align=center| 0–4 (2)
| Steve Evan-Dau
| TKO (doctor's stoppage)
| XFO 1: The Kickoff
| 
| align=center| 2
| align=center| 1:52
| Lake Geneva, Wisconsin, United States
| 
|-
| Loss
| align=center| 0–3 (2)
| Nate Homme
| Submission (triangle choke)
| XKK 4: Clash In Curtiss
| 
| align=center| 3
| align=center| 3:35
| Curtiss, Wisconsin, United States
| 
|-
| Loss
| align=center| 0–2 (2)
| Jason Veach
| TKO (cut)
| Ironheart Crown
| 
| align=center| 1
| align=center| 5:00
| Hammond, Indiana, United States
| 
|-
| NC
| align=center| 0–1 (2)
| Jorge Ortiz
| No Contest (Pre-Fight Foul)
| Ultimate Fighting Mexico
| 
| align=center| 1
| align=center| 0:00
| Monterrey, Mexico
| 
|-
| NC
| align=center| 0–1 (1)
| Steve Evan-Dau
| No Contest (illegal strikes)
| Extreme Challenge 4
| 
| align=center| 3
| align=center| 2:51
| Lakewood, Illinois, United States
| 
|-
| Loss
| align=center| 0–1
| Adrian Serrano
| Decision
| Silverback Classic 17
| 
| align=center| 3
| align=center| 5:00
| Ottawa, Illinois, United States
| 
|-

References

External links

Living people
1977 births
American male mixed martial artists
American people of Italian descent
Mixed martial artists from Illinois
Light heavyweight mixed martial artists
Heavyweight mixed martial artists
Mixed martial artists utilizing collegiate wrestling
Mixed martial artists utilizing Brazilian jiu-jitsu
People from Mokena, Illinois
American gangsters of Italian descent
American male sport wrestlers
Amateur wrestlers
American practitioners of Brazilian jiu-jitsu